is a passenger railway station in the city of Naka, Ibaraki, Japan operated by East Japan Railway Company (JR East).

Lines
Nukada Station is served by the Hitachi-Ōta Spur Line of the Suigun Line, and is located 3.6 rail kilometers from the official starting point of the spur line at Kami-Sugaya Station.

Station layout
The station consists of a single side platform serving traffic in both directions. The station is unattended.

History
Nukata Station opened on November 16, 1897 as a station on the Ota Railway.  The Ota Railway merged with the Mito Railway on October 21, 1901 and was nationalized on December 1, 1927. The station was absorbed into the JR East network upon the privatization of the Japanese National Railways (JNR) on April 1, 1987.

Surrounding area

Nukada Post Office
Kuji River

See also
List of railway stations in Japan

External links

 JR East Station information 

Railway stations in Ibaraki Prefecture
Suigun Line
Railway stations in Japan opened in 1897
Naka, Ibaraki